Cape Moore is a cape at the east end of Tapsell Foreland which forms the north side of the entrance to Smith Inlet, on the north coast of Victoria Land, Antarctica.

References

Headlands of Victoria Land
Pennell Coast